Ellen Andrea Wang (born 10 October 1986 in Gjøvik, Norway) is a Norwegian jazz musician (double bass and singer) and composer. She is the cousin of singer-songwriter Marthe Wang. Raised in Søndre Land, Oppland, she released her debut album, Diving, in 2014. She formed the band Pixel in 2010. Wang has toured with Manu Katché and Marilyn Mazur and has performed with Sting.

Career 

Wang started playing the violin at a young age, but substituted an upright bass for the violin at the age of sixteen, and attended the Norwegian Academy of Music under guidance of the bassist Bjørn Kjellemyr. She is leading her own Ellen Andrea Wang Trio and the band "Pixel", is a driving force in the band "SynKoke", and is in addition part of the band Dag Arnesen Trio (2010 -). The gig by "Pixel" including drummer Jon Audun Baar, trumpeter Jonas Kilmork Vemøy and saxophonist Harald Lassen, was noted as "one of the most memorable moments" of the Match and Fuse Festival, by the Jazz magazine Down Beat.

At Oslo Jazz Festival 2013, Wang for the first time presented a band that bears her name Ellen Andrea Wang Trio.  On the keyboards is Andreas Ulvo, well known from the "Eple Trio" and Mathias Eick's band.  On the drums is Erland Dahlen, who collaborates with Nils Petter Molvær and Susanna Wallumrød among others. The trio play an innovative jazz with elements from the rock and pop world.

At Vossajazz 2014, she appeared within Ivar Kolve's Polyostinat experience. Here she performed with Norwegian elite musicians, and delivered an indulgent polyrhythmic and polyharmonic treat for the discerning ear.

At Moldejazz 2014, Wang presented material from her debut solo album Diving. The Ellen Andrea Wang Trio play a wonderful mix of jazz, pop and rock, with catchy melodies and hypnotic grooves.

In October 2014 the bands "Pixel" and "SynKoke" delivered gigs at the London venue Vortex Jazz Club during the 'Match and Fuse Festival'.

Wang received the Kongsberg Jazz Festivals great musician price in July 2015. The prize is awarded to a musician who has a leading position on the Norwegian jazz scene.

In 2018 she released the album Run, Boy, Run with the vocal trio Gurls including Hanna Paulsberg and Rohey Taalah on the Grappa label.

Honors 
2011: "This year's Talent Award" at "DølaJazz»
2012: "Statkraft Young Star" at "Oslo Jazzfestival"
2012: "New Star of The Month" by the "Japan Magazine"
2013: Featured at Young Nordic Jazz Comets within Pixel
2015: The Kongsberg Jazz Award (DnB Award) at Kongsberg Jazzfestival

Discography

Solo albums 
Ellen Andrea Wang Trio
 2014: Diving (Propeller)
 2017: Blank Out (Jazzland)
 2019: Closeness (Ropeadope Records, 2019)
 2020: There is a place - single (Ropeadope Records 2020)

With SynKoke
 2009: Hokjønn (AIMSoundCity)
 2011: The Ideologist (Kokeplate)

With Pixel
 2012: Reminder (Cuneiform)
 2013: We Are All Small Pixels (Cuneiform)
 2015: Golden Years (Cuneiform)

 With Gurls
 2018: Run Boy, Run (Grappa)

Collaborations 
With Pastor Wang Quintet
 2007: Blå Hymne (Wango Productions)

With The Opium Cartel
 2009: Night Blooms (Termo)

With Dag Arnesen Trio
 2010: Norwegian Song 3 (Losen)

With Amherst
 2010: A Light Exists in Spring (NorCD)

With White Willow
 2011: Terminal Twilight (Termo)
 2017: Future Hopes (The Laser's Edge)

With Lena Nymark
 2014: Beautiful Silence (Grappa)

See also 

 List of jazz bassists

References

External links 

1986 births
Living people
21st-century Norwegian upright-bassists
Norwegian jazz upright-bassists
Jazz double-bassists
Musicians from Gjøvik
People from Søndre Land
Women double-bassists
21st-century women musicians
21st-century Norwegian singers
21st-century Norwegian women singers
Pixel (band) members
Jazzland Recordings (1997) artists
Propeller Recordings artists